HC Fassa Falcons, previously known as HC Fassa, are an ice hockey team from Canazei, Italy. They play in the Alps Hockey League, having formerly played in the top division of Italian ice hockey, the Serie A.

The club was founded as Hockey Club Canazei in 1955.

References

External links
 Official website

Ice hockey teams in Italy
Alpenliga teams
1955 establishments in Italy
Ice hockey clubs established in 1955
Sport in Trentino